The Canal de la Charente à la Seudre, also called Canal Bridoire, is a 39 km canal near the western shore of France. It connects the Charente (river) at Rochefort to the Seudre at Marennes.

See also
 List of canals in France

References

External links
 www.ile-oleron-marennes.com

Canals in France
Canals opened in 1812